The term Dogra Rajput refers to Dogra people belonging to the Rajput clans found in the Jammu region and parts of Himachal Pradesh and Punjab.

Dogra Rajput dynasty ruled Jammu and Kashmir till 1947. Hari Singh was the last ruler of this dynasty.

There is also a regiment in the Indian Army named after him, which is called Dogra Regiment.

Notable people

 Banda Bahadur - founder of Sikh Khalsa force and monastery at Nanded near Godavari
 Mian Dido Jamwal - led a rebellion against the Sikh Empire, remembered as a folk hero by people of Jammu
 Gulab Singh - founder of royal Dogra dynasty and first Maharaja of the princely state of Jammu and Kashmir,
 Zorawar Singh – General of Maharaja Gulab Singh
 Ranbir Singh - Maharaja of Jammu and Kashmir and head of the Jamwal Rajput clan.
 Pratap Singh Maharaja of Jammu and Kashmir
 Bhim Singh – Leader of the JKNPP, Ex General Secretary of the All India Congress Committee and international activist for secular democratic values.
 Hari Singh (1895–1961) – last ruling Maharaja of the princely state / State of Jammu and Kashmir.
 Karan Singh – Congress leader and first President of Jammu and Kashmir. Son of Maharaja Hari Singh.
 Maharaja Gulab Singh – General of Maharaja Ranjit Singh and later Maharaja of the Dogra State of Jammu and Kashmir
 Chaudhry Muhammad Sarwar Khan (1919–2003) - Longest Serving Pakistani Parliamentarian from Rupochak, District Narowal/Sialkot.
 Jitendra Singh   - BJP politician and union Minister

References

 "Dogra Rajputs". Footprints in the Snow: On the Trail of Zorawar Singh By G. D. Bakshi

External links
 Duggar Times- A portal of Dogras
 Proclamation of 1 May 1951 on Jammu & Kashmir Constituent Assembly by Yuvraj (Crown Prince) Karan Singh from the Official website of Government of Jammu and Kashmir, India

Rajputs
Dogra
Dogra people
Social groups of Jammu and Kashmir
Social groups of Himachal Pradesh
Social groups of Punjab, India
Social groups of Azad Kashmir
Ethnic groups in Pakistan
Ethnic groups in India
Himalayan peoples
Indo-Aryan peoples
Indian surnames
Social groups of India
Social groups of Pakistan